Vanessa Hinz (born 24 March 1992) is a former German biathlete and cross-country skier. Hinz started in her first world cup races at the end of the 2012/13-season. At the 2013 European Championships she won a gold medal with the German relay team. In 2014, she participated in the Winter Olympics in Sochi. She was officially nominated by the DOSB on 23 January 2014, but not taken with the team to Russia. So she had to wait at home as stand-by reserve.

Biathlon results
All results are sourced from the International Biathlon Union.

Olympic Games
1 medal (1 bronze)

*The mixed relay was added as an event in 2014.

World Championships
7 medals (3 gold, 4 silver)

World Cup

Individual podiums

*Results are from IBU races which include the Biathlon World Cup, Biathlon World Championships and the Winter Olympic Games.

Updated on 11 March 2022

Relay victories
 10 victories – (9 relay, 1 mixed relay)

References

External links

1992 births
Living people
German female biathletes
German female cross-country skiers
Biathletes at the 2014 Winter Olympics
Biathletes at the 2018 Winter Olympics
Biathletes at the 2022 Winter Olympics
Medalists at the 2022 Winter Olympics
Olympic biathletes of Germany
Olympic bronze medalists for Germany
Olympic medalists in biathlon
Skiers from Munich
Biathlon World Championships medalists
21st-century German women